Flaviano Ponce Olivares (1911-1997) was a Philippine Brigadier general and a three-time recipient of Distinguished Service Star and a single Military Merit Medal. He graduated in 1936. Olivares was a Constabulary Zone Commander at Panama Canal Zone in 1961, following by Deputy Chief of Staff of the Armed Forces of the Philippines a two years later, and becoming a Commanding General for the 1st Infantry Division by 1964. In 1965 he became a chief in Philippine Constabulary. He died on December 23, 1997 after being diagnosed with aneurysm of the abdominal aorta at age 86.

References

1997 deaths
Filipino generals
Filipino police chiefs
Ferdinand Marcos administration personnel
1911 births